is a railway station on the Iida Line in the village of Tenryū, Shimoina, Nagano Prefecture, Japan, operated by Central Japan Railway Company (JR Central).

Lines
Ugusu Station is served by the Iida Line and is 91.7 kilometers from the starting point of the line at Toyohashi Station.

Station layout
The station consists of a single ground-level side platform serving one bi-directional track. The station is unattended. There is no station building.

Adjacent stations

History
Ugusu Station opened on 30 December 1936. With the privatization of Japanese National Railways (JNR) on 1 April 1987, the station came under the control of JR Central.

Passenger statistics
In fiscal 2016, the station was used by an average of 3 passengers daily (boarding passengers only).

Surrounding area
 Tenryu River

See also
 List of railway stations in Japan

References

External links

 Ugusu Station information 

Railway stations in Nagano Prefecture
Railway stations in Japan opened in 1936
Stations of Central Japan Railway Company
Iida Line
Tenryū, Nagano